Kootenai Peak is located in the Lewis Range, Glacier National Park in the U.S. state of Montana. Kootenai Peak is in the northeastern section of Glacier National Park.

Climate
Based on the Köppen climate classification, it is located in an alpine subarctic climate zone with long, cold, snowy winters, and cool to warm summers. Temperatures can drop below −10 °F with wind chill factors below −30 °F.

Geology

Like other mountains in Glacier National Park, it is composed of sedimentary rock laid down during the Precambrian to Jurassic periods.

See also
 Mountains and mountain ranges of Glacier National Park (U.S.)

Gallery

References

Kootenai Peak
Mountains of Glacier National Park (U.S.)
Lewis Range
Mountains of Montana